Nikesh is an Indian masculine given name. Notable people with the name include:
Nikesh Patel (born 1985), British actor
Nikesh Arora (born 1968), Indian-American business executive
Nikesh Shukla (born 1980), British author and screenwriter
Nikesha Patel, British-Indian actress
Nikesh Ram, Indian businessman and actor
Nikesh Singh Sidhu (born 1999), Singaporean footballer